Harry Patrick Vaughan is an Irish professional footballer who plays as a midfielder for Hull City.

Playing career

Club
Vaughan made his first-team debut for Oldham Athletic on 23 February 2021, coming on for Marcus Barnes with 15 minutes left to play of a 1–0 defeat to Barrow at Boundary Park. Head coach Harry Kewell said that "clearly he's not afraid of anything, which is good". On 14 December 2022, Vaughan joined Northern Premier League side Radcliffe on a one-month youth loan.

On 31 January 2023 joined Hull City on an 18-month contract.

International
On 4 October 2021, he was called up to the Republic of Ireland U19 squad for the first time, for their double header of friendlies against Sweden U19 in Marbella, Spain. He made his underage international debut on 8 October 2021 in a 2–2 draw with Sweden. Harry qualifies to play for Ireland due to Irish heritage on his Mother's side.

Style of play
Vaughan has been described as an intelligent midfielder who is quick with the ball at his feet.

Statistics

References

2004 births
Living people
Republic of Ireland association footballers
Republic of Ireland youth international footballers
Association football forwards
Oldham Athletic A.F.C. players
Radcliffe F.C. players
Hull City A.F.C. players
English Football League players
National League (English football) players